The Blue Devils Drum and Bugle Corps is a World Class competitive junior drum and bugle corps based in Concord, California. The Blue Devils are members of Drum Corps International (DCI). They have finished first or second since 2007, and have placed no lower than fifth since 1975. They also hold the record for the highest score in DCI history, winning the 2014 DCI World Championships with a score of 99.65. The Blue Devils are the current DCI Champions, with a record of twenty titles to date.

History
In 1957, Tony and Ann Odello and the Concord VFW post assumed control of the Martinettes, a defunct drum corps and drill team. They reorganized the unit as the Blue Devils. Initially, the group performed as an all-boy drum corps with an all-girl drill team. In 1958, the Blue Devils added glockenspiels, becoming a drum and bell corps, while the girls became a separate baton twirling troupe, the Majorettes. The two units continued to perform together, winning numerous state and local competitions between 1957 and 1970. In 1961, the Blue Devils added a flag section to the unit that was then competing in the state's Junior division. In 1968, the drum and bell corps moved into Senior Division competition, and the new junior corps, Blue Devils B, was founded.

In 1970, a group of buglers was added to the Blue Devils drums and flags, and the corps entered its first competition as the Blue Devils Drum and Bugle Corps. By 1972, the unit, now with over seventy members, advanced from Class B competition to Class A and traveled on tour outside California for the first time. The summer of 1973 marked the Blue Devils first national tour and their first appearance at the Drum Corps International World Championships in Whitewater, Wisconsin. The younger Blue Devils C Drum and Bugle Corps was also formed in 1973. In 1976, the Blue Devils won the first of the corps' twenty DCI World Championship titles.

Over the years, the Devils have often made use of jazz and Latin music repertoires, notably Bill Reddie's Channel One Suite (made famous by Buddy Rich) and charts from the music of Chick Corea and Chuck Mangione and that written for Stan Kenton's big band.

In 2014, the Blue Devils won their sixteenth DCI World Championship. At the DCI Finals in Indianapolis on August 9, the corps received a record high score of 99.650. The Blue Devils are also the only corps to have crossed the 99-point threshold twice in DCI World Championship history, achieving a 99.050 in 2009, and a 99.650 in 2014.

In the Blue Devils' 2017 program, voiceovers were used from a newly-discovered audio tape recording of the late former director Jerry Seawright addressing the crowd at the Blue Devils' first appearance as a drum and bugle corps in 1972.

Sponsorship

The Blue Devils Drum and Bugle Corps is sponsored by BD Performing Arts, a 501(c)(3) musical organization.

BD Performing Arts also sponsors the Blue Devils B, the Blue Devils C, the Blue Devils Open Class and A Class Winter Guards programs, the Diablo Wind Symphony, and BD Entertainment.

In 2015, BD Performing Arts added the Blue Devils International Corps, a 97-member unit made up of alumni of the Blue Devils and 8 other DCI World Class corps. The corps spent more than a month traveling and performing in the Netherlands, the United Kingdom, France, Italy, and Switzerland, concluding with 9 days and 15 performances of their show at the Basel Tattoo in Switzerland. A similar tour was planned for 2020, with stops in Germany, France, Italy, the Netherlands, and the Basel Tattoo in Switzerland, but was canceled due to the COVID-19 pandemic.

Show summary (1972–2022) 
Source:

Caption awards 
At the annual World Championship Finals, Drum Corps International (DCI) presents awards to the corps with the high average scores from prelims, semifinals, and finals in five captions. The Blue Devils have won these caption awards:

Don Angelica Best General Effect Award
  2003, 2007, 2009, 2010, 2012, 2014, 2017, 2022

John Brazale Best Visual Performance Award
  2001, 2003, 2007, 2008, 2009, 2010, 2012 (tie), 2014, 2015, 2017, 2019, 2022

George Zingali Best Color Guard Award
  2001, 2003, 2006, 2008, 2009, 2010, 2011, 2012, 2013, 2014, 2015

Jim Ott Best Brass Performance Award
   2001, 2003, 2004, 2007, 2008, 2010, 2014, 2022

Fred Sanford Best Percussion Performance Award
  2007, 2009, 2012, 2015

Prior to 2000 and the adoption of the current scoring format, the Blue Devils won these captions:

High General Effect Award
 1976, 1977, 1979, 1981, 1982, 1986, 1994
High Visual Award
 1976, 1978, 1982, 1986, 1994, 1995, 1996, 1997, 1999
High Color Guard Award
 1979 (tie), 1982, 1984, 1986, 1990, 1992, 1995, 1997, 1998, 1999
High Brass Award
 1976, 1977, 1979, 1980, 1981, 1982, 1984 (3 way tie), 1985 (tie), 1986, 1988, 1991 (tie), 1993 (tie), 1994, 1995 (3 way tie), 1997, 1998, 1999
High Percussion Award
 1976, 1977, 1983, 1984, 1985, 1986, 1994, 1996, 1997

Blue Devils B Drum and Bugle Corps 
The Blue Devils B Drum and Bugle Corps are an Open Class competitive junior drum and bugle corps based in Concord, California. The corps is a member of Drum Corps International and has grown from a feeder corps for the Blue Devils Drum and Bugle Corps to a full-fledged Drum Corps in its own right. The corps has won the DCI Open Class World Championship five times.

History 
In 1968, the original Blue Devils corps moved up from B Class competition to A Class, and the Blue Devils B was started as a younger cadet corps. In 1973, the Blue Devils B converted from a drum and bell corps to a drum and bugle corps.

As a cadet corps, the unit performed for years almost exclusively on the West Coast. Only when the World Championships were held in Pasadena, California did the Blue Devils B become a regular competitor in the Division II & III (now Open Class) Championships. The Blue Devils B won the first of three consecutive Open Class World Championships in Indianapolis in 2009. In 2011, the corps also competed in World Class preliminaries, finishing in 19th place and earning membership in DCI.

On September 5, 2018, BD Performing Arts, Vanguard Music & Performing Arts, and Drum Corps International announced that the Blue Devils B had "decided to travel and compete only in California for the 2019 season" and that both the Blue Devils B and the Vanguard Cadets Drum and Bugle Corps would not attend DCI Open Class Championships in 2019.

Show summary (1977–2022) 
Source:

Blue Devils C Drum and Bugle Corps 
The Blue Devils C Drum and Bugle Corps are an Open Class competitive junior drum and bugle corp and a feeder corps for the Blue Devils Drum and Bugle Corps.

As a junior cadet corps, with members aged 8–14, the unit for many years performed only as a parade and exhibition unit, not entering actual competition. The corps began entering field competitions in 2001, but the corps still performs almost exclusively on the West Coast.

Show summary (1995–2022) 
Source:

References

External links
Official website

Drum Corps International World Class corps
Organizations based in Contra Costa County, California
Culture of Concord, California
Musical groups established in 1957
1957 establishments in California